Frank Appleton Collymore MBE (7 January 1893 – 17 July 1980) was a Barbadian literary editor, writer, poet, stage performer and painter. His nickname was "Barbadian Man of the Arts". He also taught for 50 years at Combermere School, where he sought out and encouraged prospective writers in his classes, notably George Lamming and Austin Clarke. Collymore was the founder and long-time editor of pioneering Caribbean literary magazine BIM.

Background
Frank Collymore was born to Rebecca Wilhelmina Clarke and Joseph Appleton Collymore at Woodville Cottage, Chelsea Road, Saint Michael, Barbados (where he lived all his life). Aside from being a student at Combermere School (from 1903 until 1910), he was also one of its staff members until his retirement in 1958, up to which point he was its Deputy Headmaster. After this, he often returned to teach until 1963.

On the stage, he became a member of the "Bridgetown Players", which began in 1942. As an artist, he made many drawings and paintings to illustrate his own writings. He called them "Collybeasts" or "Collycreatures".

BIM magazine
In 1942, Collymore began the famous Caribbean literary magazine BIM (originally published four times a year), for which he is most well-known, and he was its editor until 1975. John T. Gilmore has written of Collymore: "As a lover of literature, he was also a dedicated and selfless encourager of the work of others, lending books to aspiring writers from their schooldays onwards, publishing their early work in Bim, the literary magazine he edited for more than fifty issues from the 1940s to the 1970s, and helping them to find other markets, especially through the relationship he established with Henry Swanzy, producer of the influential BBC radio programme Caribbean Voices."

Legacy
Three literary awards have been named after him. The Frank Collymore Literary Endowment was established by the Central Bank of Barbados to honour his memory as well as to recognise, support and reward literary talent in Barbados, while the Frank Collymore Hall was constructed as a venue for distinguished public speakers and cultural events.

Works
BIM (1942–75)
Thirty Poems (1944)
Beneath the Casuarinas (1945)
Flotsam (1948)
Collected Poems (1959)
Rhymed Ruminations on the Fauna of Barbados (1968)
Notes for a Glossary of Words and Phrases of Barbadian Dialect (1970)
Selected Poems (1971)
The Man Who Loved Attending Funerals and Other Stories (1993) (published posthumously)
Day's End (year unknown)

Awards and honours
Order of the British Empire – 1958
University of the West Indies M.A. – 1968
Savacou: A Journal of the Caribbean Artists Movement (January/June), ed. Edward Kamau Brathwaite, dedicated "A Tribute to Frank Collymore" (1973)
Queen Elizabeth II Silver Jubilee Medal – 1977

See also

George Lamming, another famous Barbadian author.
Amaryllis Collymore, his great-great-great grandmother

Further reading
Edward Baugh, Frank Collymore: A Biography (Ian Randle Publishers, 2009), 
 Philip Nanton, "Frank A. Collymore: A Man of the Threshold", Kunapipi, Vol. 26, Issue 1, 2004.

References

External links
 Edward Baugh, "In praise of Colly", The Caribbean Review of Books, May 2008.

The Frank Collymore Hall (most of the content above is taken from Collymore's biography at this site)
Frank Collymore Literary Award
The Frank Collymore Literary Endowment

1893 births
1980 deaths
20th-century male writers
20th-century poets
Barbadian male writers
Barbadian poets
Literary editors
Male poets
Members of the Order of the British Empire
People from Saint Michael, Barbados